Sabeckis is a Lithuanian surname. Notable people with the surname include:

Donatas Sabeckis (born 1992), Lithuanian basketball player
Gvidas Sabeckis (born 1984), Lithuanian tennis player

See also
Sobieski (disambiguation)

Lithuanian-language surnames